The Grove School of Engineering (GSoE) is the engineering school of the City College of the City University of New York (City College), a public university in New York City. It is one of the five schools of City College and CUNY's primary school of engineering.

The GSoE is housed in the Steinman Hall, located in the northern side of the City College of New York's campus. It offers undergraduate and graduate engineering education. It includes 15 research institutes covering all major areas of engineering, including: Biomedical engineering, chemical engineering, electrical engineering, mechanical engineering, civil engineering, and environmental engineering. The school currently has over five hundred students and 110 faculty on staff.

In October 2005, the former CCNY Engineering School became the Grove School of Engineering when Andrew Grove, a school alumni and co-founder of the Intel Corporation, made the largest single donation that the CCNY has ever received. Grove’s donation of $26 million brought the school to the cutting edge in research and equipment.

References

External links
 Official website

City College of New York
Engineering universities and colleges in New York (state)